André Lindboe (born 3 November 1988) is a Norwegian handball player for Elverum Håndball and the Norwegian national team.

References

1988 births
Living people
Norwegian male handball players
Sportspeople from Tønsberg